The 1998 Hounslow Council election took place on 7 May 1998 to elect members of Hounslow London Borough Council in London, England. The whole council was up for election and the Labour party stayed in overall control of the council.

The election saw Phil Andrews become the first member of Isleworth Community Group elected to the council after defeating a Labour candidate by two votes. However both the Labour and Conservative parties said they would not work with him due to his past membership of the National Front.

At the same as the election Hounslow saw 74.6% vote in favour of the 1998 Greater London Authority referendum and 25.4% against, on a 31.9% turnout.

Election result

Ward results

References

1998 London Borough council elections
Council elections in the London Borough of Hounslow